The Togcha River is a river in village of Yona in the United States territory of Guam.

See also
List of rivers of Guam

References

Rivers of Guam
Talofofo, Guam
Yona, Guam